Darin is both a given name and a surname. Notable people with the name include:

Given name
Darin (singer) (born 1987), full name Darin Zanyar, a Swedish pop singer of Kurdish origin
Darin Strauss (born 1970), American author
Darin Erstad (born 1974), American baseball player and coach
Darin Ahmad (born 1979), Syrian artist, poet and writer
Darin Morgan (born 1966), American screenwriter and actor
Darin De Paul (born 1963), American voice actor
Darin Ruf (born 1986), American major league baseball player

Surname 
Bobby Darin (1936–1973), American pop singer
Mark Darin, American video game designer and writer
Ricardo Darín (born 1957), Argentine actor
Chino Darín (born 1989), Argentine actor

See also
Daron, given name and surname

Unisex given names